Youssuf Sylla (born 19 December 2002) is a Belgian footballer who plays as a centre forward for Belgian First Division A club Zulte Waregem.

Personal life
Sylla is the son of the Guinean footballer Atiebou Sympa.

References

2002 births
Living people
Belgian footballers
Belgian people of Guinean descent
Association football forwards
S.V. Zulte Waregem players
Belgian Pro League players